Mardan Mamat (born 31 October 1967) is a Singaporean professional golfer.

Mamat was born in Singapore. He turned professional in 1994.

Mamat plays on the Asian Tour, where he won for the first time at the 2004 Royal Challenge Indian Open. In 2006 he won the OSIM Singapore Masters, which was co-sanctioned by the Asian Tour and the European Tour. This made him the first player from Singapore to win a European Tour event, and earned him a two-year exemption into the European Tour.

Mamat was the first Singaporean to play in The Open Championship when he qualified in 1997. He has also won several minor professional tournaments and was a member of the winning Rest of Asia team at the 2005 Dynasty Cup.

Personal life
Mamat is married and has five children. His son, Hairul Syirhan, is a goalkeeper at S.League club Geylang International.

Amateur wins
1993 Putra Cup (Hong Kong, as individual and team)
1994 Malaysian Amateur Open

Professional wins (15)

European Tour wins (1)

1Co-sanctioned by the Asian Tour

Asian Tour wins (5)

1Co-sanctioned by the European Tour

Asian Tour playoff record (0–1)

Asian Development Tour wins (1)

1Co-sanctioned by the Professional Golf of Malaysia Tour

ASEAN PGA Tour wins (4)

1Co-sanctioned by the Professional Golf of Malaysia Tour

Other wins (5)
1993 Singapore PGA Championship (as an amateur)
1994 Singapore PGA Championship (as an amateur)
1997 Emirates PGA Golf Championship (Singapore)
1998 Emirates PGA Golf Championship (Singapore)
2001 PFP Classic (Malaysia)

Results in major championships

Note: Mamat only played in The Open Championship.

CUT = missed the half-way cut
DQ = Disqualified

Results in World Golf Championships

"T" = Tied

Team appearances
Amateur
Eisenhower Trophy (representing Singapore): 1992
Putra Cup (Hong Kong): 1993 (winners)

Professional
World Cup (representing Singapore): 2002, 2005, 2006, 2009, 2011
Dynasty Cup (representing Asia): 2005 (winners)

See also
List of golfers with most Asian Tour wins

References

External links

Singaporean male golfers
Asian Tour golfers
European Tour golfers
Asian Games competitors for Singapore
Golfers at the 1994 Asian Games
Singaporean Muslims
Singaporean people of Malay descent
1967 births
Living people
20th-century Singaporean people